Lodderena janetmayae is a species of sea snail, a marine gastropod mollusk in the family Skeneidae.

Description
The size of the shell is 1 mm.

Distribution
This species occurs in the Atlantic Ocean off the Bahamas at a depth of 14 m.

References

External links

janetmayae
Gastropods described in 1998